Annie Cotton (born July 13, 1975, in Laval, Quebec) is a Canadian actress and singer.

Cotton played a role in a TV series called Watatatow. On January 25, 2007, she appeared in the French Canadian long-time daily soap Virginie as well-known artist Annie Cloutier.

In 1993, Cotton became the second Canadian to represent Switzerland in the Eurovision Song Contest, after Céline Dion in 1988, performing the song "Moi, tout simplement". The song finished third with 148 points.

External links 

1975 births
Living people
Actresses from Quebec
People from Laval, Quebec
Singers from Quebec
Eurovision Song Contest entrants for Switzerland
Eurovision Song Contest entrants of 1993
Canadian women pop singers
21st-century Canadian women singers